Phil Traynor  was an association football player who represented New Zealand at international level.

Traynor made his full All Whites debut in a 1–8 loss to Australia on 11 September 1948 and ended his international playing career with 11 A-international caps to his credit, his final cap an appearance in a 1–4 loss to Australia on 4 September 1954.

References

New Zealand association footballers
New Zealand international footballers
Year of birth missing
Year of death missing
Waterside Karori players
Association football inside forwards
Association football wing halves